Amiri may refer to:

People
 Amiri (surname)
 Amiri Baraka (1934–2014), American writer

Places
 Amiri, Bushehr, a village in Bushehr Province, Iran
 Amiri-ye Olya, a village in Chaharmahal and Bakhtiari Province, Iran
 Amiri-ye Sofla, a village in Chaharmahal and Bakhtiari Province, Iran
 Amiri, Kermanshah, a village in Kermanshah Province, Iran
 Amiri, Aden Protectorate, South Arabia

Other uses
 Amiri decree, the decree of an Emir or his representatives
 Amiri Hospital, a general hospital in Kuwait City
 Amiri Press in Bulaq, Cairo
 Amiri (typeface), a naskh-based Arabic typeface

See also
 al-Amiri (disambiguation)